Jean-Noël Fagot (born 9 December 1958) is a former ice speed skater from France, who represented his native country at the 1984 Winter Olympics in Sarajevo, Yugoslavia.

References

External links
 SkateResults

1958 births
Living people
French male speed skaters
Speed skaters at the 1984 Winter Olympics
Olympic speed skaters of France
Place of birth missing (living people)